Wendy-O Matik (born Wendy Millstine on July 19, 1966 in Covina, California) is a Bay Area-based freelance writer, poet, performance and spoken word artist, and radical love activist. Her website defines radical love as "the freedom to love whom you want, how you want, and as many as you want, so long as personal integrity, respect, honesty, and consent are at the core of any and all relationships."

She graduated from the University of California, Berkeley in 1988 with a Bachelor of Arts Degree in Political Science, and also holds a state-certified degree as a holistic Nutrition Consultant, specializing in diet and stress reduction, from Bauman College, Berkeley, CA (2006).

Her book Redefining Our Relationships: Guidelines for Responsible Open Relationships was published in 2002: it has been reprinted several times, and is now required reading in the human sexuality class at San Francisco State University. Since its publication, she has taught over a hundred Radical Love & Relationship workshops internationally. She is often invited to speak at venues such as universities and progressive bookstores. She has been described by the magazine Profane Existence as "a special kind of revolutionary woman".

Selected works

Redefining Our Relationships: Guidelines for Responsible Open Relationships, Defiant Times Press (2002),  (7th printing)

Series
Five Good Minutes: 100 Morning Practices To Help You Stay Calm & Focused All Day Long , New Harbinger Publications (2005)
Five Good Minutes in the Evening: 100 Mindful Practices to Help You Unwind from the Day & Make the Most of Your Night  (2006)
Five Good Minutes at Work: 100 Mindful Practices to Help You Relieve Stress & Bring Your Best to Work  (2007)
Five Good Minutes With the One You Love: 100 Mindful Practices to Deepen & Renew Your Love Every Day  (2008)
Five Good Minutes in Your Body: 100 Mindful Practices to Help You Accept Yourself and Feel at Home in Your Body  (2009)
Daily Meditations for Calming Your Anxious Mind, New Harbinger Publications  (2008)
The Power of Connection: 50 Meditations to Nurture Your Sense of Connection to Yourself, Others, & the World Around You, New Harbinger Publications, (Spring 2011)

Anthologies
Sex & Relationships: An Anthology,  edited by John Elia, Ph.D. & Ivy Chen, MPH, Kendall/Hunt Publishing (2005)
In Our Own Words: A Generation Defining Itself, edited by Marlow Peerse Weaver, MW Enterprises (2005)
Concrete Dreams: Manic D Press Early Works,  Manic D Press (2002)
Revival: Spoken Word from Lollapalooza '94,   Manic D Press (1995)
Signs of Life: Channel Surfing Through '90s Culture,  Manic D Press (1994)
Psyche Subversion, Andromeda Press (1992)

Poetry
What I Left Behind, Defiant Times Press (2003)	
Damaged Goods, Defiant Times Press (2001)
Gutless, Defiant Times Press (1998)
Love Like Rage, Manic D Press (1994) 
Fill It Full of Holes, Defiant Times Press (1995)
She Knew Better, Manic D Press (1992)
So Much for Passion, Manic D Press (1990)

Discography
Ladyfest Melbourne Compilation 2003, Melbourne, Australia (Revolver Upstairs (2003)
Solo Stuff I: Recorded Live at the Royal George (New Cross, London), UK (2003)
Total War Against State & Capitol, Vol. II, Hidden Power Enterprises, Sweden (2003)
Total War Against State & Capitol, Vol. I, Hidden Power Enterprises, Sweden (2001)
Spoken Word Compilation (Pug-016), Evolution Records, USA (2001)
Krauts, Yanks & Limey!, Bremen, Oakland, Bath Sampler, GEMA Records, Germany (1998)
Home Alive: The Art of Self Defense, Epic Records, USA (1996)
Gag Order, False Faces, Judgmental Records, USA (1994)
Logical Nonsense/Grimple Split, East Bay Menace Records, USA (1993)
Consolidated, Play More Music, Play It Again Sam Records-Netwerk Europe (1992)
Powerless II: No More Flowers, No More Ribbons, Black Plastic Records, USA (1992)
Give Me Back, Ebullition Records, USA (1991)
Econochrist, Ebullition Records, USA (1988–1993)

Videography
 Step Up and Be Vocal, Interviews zu Queer Punk und Feminismus in San Francisco (2001) Bremen, Germany, 60 min
Gynopunk, University of California Berkeley, Senior Film Project, USA (May 1994)

References

External links 
 http://www.wendyomatik.com
 http://www.fivegoodminutes.com

1966 births
Living people
American spoken word artists
People from Pomona, California
Writers from the San Francisco Bay Area
American women poets
Poets from California
21st-century American poets
21st-century American women writers